Vicente Asumu Esono Bindang (born 30 October 2002), also known as Vicente Esono and Jordan, is an Equatorial Guinean footballer who plays as a defender for Cano Sport Academy and the Equatorial Guinea national team.

International career
Asumu made his international debut for Equatorial Guinea on 28 July 2019.

References

External links

2002 births
Living people
Equatoguinean footballers
Association football defenders
Cano Sport Academy players
Equatorial Guinea youth international footballers
Equatorial Guinea international footballers
Equatoguinean people of Gabonese descent
Sportspeople of Gabonese descent